The 1991 NAIA men's basketball tournament was held in March at Kemper Arena in Kansas City, Missouri. The 54th annual NAIA basketball tournament featured 32 teams playing in a single-elimination format.

Awards and honors
Leading scorers: 
Leading rebounder: 
Player of the Year: est. 1994.

Bracket

  * denotes overtime.

See also
 1991 NAIA women's basketball tournament
 1991 NCAA men's basketball tournaments (Division I, Division II, Division III)
 1991 NCAA women's basketball tournaments (Division I, Division II, Division III)
 1991 National Invitation Tournament

References

NAIA Men's Basketball Championship
Tournament
NAIA men's basketball tournament
NAIA men's basketball tournament
College basketball tournaments in Missouri
Basketball competitions in Kansas City, Missouri